25 (Close Support) Engineer Group is an engineering group of the British Army's Corps of Royal Engineers.

History 
The group was formed in 2014 under the Army 2020 programme.

Current structure
After the Army 2020 Refine, the group now has the following structure (Volunteer units have RHQ location shown);

Group Headquarters, at Wing Barracks, Bulford Camp
21 Engineer Regiment, Royal Engineers, at Claro Barracks, Ripon
22 Engineer Regiment, Royal Engineers, at Swinton Barracks, Perham Down 
26 Engineer Regiment, Royal Engineers, at Swinton Barracks, Perham Down

Commanding officers

The Commanding officers have been:
2014–2015: Col. Charles S.E. Thackway
2015–2019: Col. Paul B. Nicholson
2019–present: Col. Stephen W. Davies

References

Groups of the Royal Engineers
Military units and formations established in 2014
Group sized units of the British Army